Leland D. Patouillet is the former Director of the University of Florida Alumni Association.

Prior to his position at the University of Florida, he served as the associate vice chancellor for alumni relations and executive director of the University of Pittsburgh Alumni Association. Before that position he was the Director of Alumni Relations for the University of South Florida for six years.

Patouillet was born in New York City and moved to Clearwater at the age of 14, when his father got a job at the University of South Florida.

Education
 Bachelor's degree in American Studies from the University of South Florida
 Master's degree in Educational Psychology from the University of Tennessee
 Doctorate in Administration and Policy Studies from the University of Pittsburgh

References

External links
Official press release of hiring

Living people
University of Pittsburgh alumni
University of Florida faculty
Year of birth missing (living people)